Coron is the third-largest island in the Calamian Islands in northern Palawan in the Philippines. The island is part of the larger municipality of the same name. Because of its unique ecological features, the entire area is protected by several legal proclamations.

The island and surrounding fishing grounds are part of the ancestral domain of the indigenous Tagbanwa people, officially designated such on June 5, 1998. Known as Calis among the Tagbanwas and Coronians, its tribal chieftain is Rodolfo Aguilar I.

The island comprises two barangays of the municipality of Coron: Banuang Daan and Cabugao.

Geography 
Partially between Busuanga and Culion islands, Coron Island faces the Sulu Sea and forms the eastern side of Coron Bay.

Part of the North Palawan Block, Coron Island is distinguished by its Late Triassic Coron Limestone.

There are 11 lakes nestled in the rugged terrain, of which three have underground connections to the sea. There are a few mangroves in coastal areas.

Diving 
The water is often calm. 

Wreck diving sites in Coron Bay include the Akitsushima, Irako, Kogyo Maru, Kyokuzan Maru, Okikawa Maru, Olympia Maru.

Dive sites around Coron include many different reef dive sites and "Günter's Cave", also known as Cathedral Cave because during a certain time of the day, the sun throws a beam of light through a hole in the cave ceiling, illuminating the inside. It is possible to surface in the cave, as the hole in the cave-ceiling allows fresh air to enter. The cave is named after Günther Bernert, who was part of the first dive group to explore the cave, after hearing from local fishermen about its existence.

Other points of interest 
Ecotourism has long surpassed diving as the top draw to Coron Island in the last decade. With domestic tourism on the rise due to a rapidly growing middle class, Coron is one of the top destinations for Filipinos to add to their wish list, with Coron Island containing some of the most iconic.

 Kayangan Lake
 Luluyuan "Barracuda" Lake
 Twin Lagoon

Gallery

See also

 List of islands of the Philippines
 Francisco B. Reyes Airport

References

External links

Calamian Islands
Underwater diving sites in the Philippines
Tourist attractions in Palawan
World Heritage Tentative List for the Philippines